The Leftist Alliance was an alliance of leftist political parties that would have run for individual seats in the Egyptian 2015 parliamentary election, though each party will run individually.

Affiliated parties
 Tagammu
 Socialist Popular Alliance Party
 Egyptian Communist Party
 Socialist Party of Egypt

References

2015 establishments in Egypt
Defunct left-wing political party alliances
Defunct political party alliances in Egypt
Organizations established in 2015
Egypt